The Van is a 1977 American low-budget teen comedy film directed by Sam Grossman and starring Stuart Getz, Deborah White, Danny DeVito, Harry Moses, Marcie Barkin, Bill Adler, Stephen Oliver, and Connie Lisa Marie.

Primarily released to drive-in theaters in 1977, the film was released at the height of the vansploitation genre. It was followed by the 1978 film Malibu Beach, in which Stephen Oliver reprised his role as bully Dugan Hicks.

Plot 
The day he graduates high school, Bobby takes ownership of a tricked-out van that's like a bachelor pad on wheels. He's disappointed, however, to see that his best friend—who has better luck with the ladies—makes more use out of it than he does. He soon meets a shy girl and falls for her, but before he can win her heart, he has to win a drag race against a local bully.

Production
Production on The Van began on November 8, 1976, with locations in Moorpark, Whittier, Stanton, and Malibu, California. Legendary car customizer George Barris was commissioned to build two Dodge B300 extended-length Tradesman vans, with one being the primary picture car, and a backup that was used for all stunt driving scenes. An additional van, the antagonist's "Van Killer", was built by Barris as well, while the vans in the "van show" sequence were all various local Southern California customs.

Soundtrack

The music heard on the film's soundtrack is mainly material originally recorded for the small GRC Records label in Atlanta several years previously by Sammy Johns, most prominently his 1975 hit single "Chevy Van". The hit serves as the opening theme song, despite the glaring discrepancy of Bobby's van being a Dodge rather than a Chevrolet. Five of the Johns' recordings that appear ("Chevy Van", "Early Morning Love", "Jenny", "Rag Doll" and "Hang My Head and Moan") were originally recorded in 1973, for the GRC album Sammy Johns and appear in their 1975 remix versions from the second edition of that album.

Five more songs ("Country Lady", "You're So Sweet", "Peas in a Pod", "Bless My Soul" and "Hey, Mr. Dreamer"), apparently dating from recording sessions for a follow-up GRC album, were used for both the film and soundtrack album. This follows a pattern Crown International had established in 1976, when the studio used Cotton, Lloyd & Christian, a 1975 album issued by 20th Century Records, as the source for all of the music in The Pom Pom Girls. In fact, the soundtrack album for The Van credits group member Michael Lloyd with "Musical Supervision" and the LP was released by Warner/Curb Records, in which Lloyd was an executive and producing chart hits by Shaun Cassidy and Debby Boone that same year.

Critique
The film shows stereotypical teenage boys whose social lives revolve around getting high, drag racing, and pursuing girls. The film features music from Sammy Johns (most notably the song Chevy Van), and is representative of its time. It exemplifies the free sex of an era before herpes and AIDS awareness, and celebrates the cultural tropes of the time, such as the heavily accessorized van that provides the film's title and the van's 8-track player.

The film is an early example of a relatively new type of teen comedy, which featured sexual situations, nudity and substance abuse, very different from the Beach Party films of the early 1960s, with their no-nudity, drug-free plots. The Van was one of a set of four Crown International Pictures releases (the others being The Pom Pom Girls, Malibu Beach and Van Nuys Blvd.) that helped herald a form that would be exemplified by 1980 with The Hollywood Knights and later with the Porky's series.

The film is referenced in every single episode of the Grindbin Podcast, a podcast dedicated to the discussion of exploitation films. The Van was the subject of the very first episode. This led to a running gag where at the end of every subsequent episode, the hosts would imagine absurd scenarios wherein Bobby and Andy (DeVito's character) would cross over to the universe of whatever film they were discussing.

Reception
In six days over the July 4 holiday, the film grossed $2.5 million from 360 theaters, a record for Crown at the time.

References

External links 
 
 

1977 films
1970s sex comedy films
American independent films
American screwball comedy films
American sex comedy films
American teen comedy films
Films set in Los Angeles
Crown International Pictures films
Vansploitation films
1970s screwball comedy films
1977 comedy films
1970s English-language films
1977 independent films
1970s American films